Frank Harrison may refer to:

 Frank Harrison (academic) (1913–2013), American academic
 Frank Harrison (cricketer) (1909–1955), English cricketer
 Frank Harrison (politician) (1940–2009), member of the U.S. House of Representatives from Pennsylvania
 Frank Llewellyn Harrison (1905–1987), Irish musicologist
 J. Frank Harrison III, American heir and businessman
 Frank Harrison, a plaintiff in the Native American voting rights case Harrison v. Laveen